Two postage stamps were issued to commemorate the British Empire Exhibition, a colonial exhibition held in Wembley Park, Wembley, in 1924–25. Two denominations, a penny red and a three halfpenny brown, were produced. They were issued again the following year with "1925" replacing "1924".

The stamps were printed in sheets of 120 which consisted of two panes of 60 (10 rows of 6). These panes were separated prior to issue to the post office making a post office sheet.

For both issues two different perforators were used, both of which were gauge 14. The first type was a comb head which gave a uniform perforation around the impressions (see illustrations above), whilst the later was a line type which perforated in one direction first then the other after rotation of the sheet. This later line type is most notable on the corners of the stamps where the perforation holes do not line up.

References

External links 
 Original artwork from the 1924 Wembley stamp issue from The British Postal Museum & Archive website

Postage stamps of the United Kingdom
Empire Exhibition Postage Stamps
Cultural depictions of George V
World's fair commemorative stamps
Postage stamps